Brighter Than a Thousand Suns is the sixth studio album by English post-punk band Killing Joke, released in November 1986 by E.G. Records. It was their first album to be distributed through Virgin Records. It entered the UK Albums Chart at number 54 on 22 November 1986, staying for one week. It was produced by Chris Kimsey, who had produced the band's 1985 album, Night Time.

Production 
The majority of the album was recorded in Berlin during October 1985 with returning producer Chris Kimsey. Keyboard player David Kovacec recalls the recording sessions and time spent in Berlin as "wild". The track "Victory" was recorded months later in Spring 1986, along with "Ecstasy" (the B-side to the Adorations single release), produced by Stewart Levine. The last track to be produced was "A Southern Sky" in August 1986, produced by Chris Tsangarides.

The album, with the exception of "A Southern Sky", was originally mixed by Chris Kimsey. However, E.G. Records requested that all of Kimsey's mixes (bar "Twilight of the Mortal") be replaced with new mixes by Julian Mendelsohn for more commercial appeal, against the wishes of the band. It was these replacement mixes which were ultimately released, with prominent reverb and the guitars and rhythm section generally mixed lower. Some songs were significantly altered, such as extending "Victory" from its original 4 minutes to over 7 in the style of a 12" remix.

The 1986 vinyl release contained only 8 tracks due to the limited runtime of LP records, while the cassette and CD versions both contained 11, each with a slightly different running order, as detailed below. The album reached number 54 in the UK Albums Chart.

At the request of Killing Joke, Chris Kimsey's original mixes were restored when the album was reissued in 2008. The reissue also features bonus tracks, including the B-side "Ecstasy". The verse riff from "Ecstasy" was reused on the track "Obsession" from Killing Joke's next album, Outside the Gate.

Reception 

Brighter Than a Thousand Suns has received a mixed response from music critics. Ned Raggett of AllMusic retrospectively wrote, "Chris Kimsey's production, effective on that earlier album [1985's Night Time], here combines with Julian Mendelsohn's mixing to result too often in blanded-out album rock throwaways". Adrien Begrand of PopMatters wrote in 2008, "Brighter Than a Thousand Suns marked a sharp decline in quality, many viewing it as a complete betrayal of Killing Joke's signature sound, but more than 20 years later, it's surprising how well parts of the album hold up [...] the hooks are undeniable." He goes on to note that the restored Kimsey mix on the 2008 re-issue "blows the old, overpolished mix out of the water."

Track listing 

 Original vinyl version

 Original cassette version

 Original CD version

Personnel 
 Killing Joke
 Jaz Coleman – vocals, keyboards
 Kevin "Geordie" Walker – guitar
 Paul Raven – bass guitar
 Paul Ferguson – drums, vocals

 Technical
 Chris Kimsey – production, mixing
 Thomas Stiehler – engineering
 Chris Tsangarides – production on "A Southern Sky"
 Bob Kraushaar – mixing on "A Southern Sky"
 Stewart Levine – production on "Victory"
 Glenn Skinner – engineering on "Victory"
 Julian Mendelsohn – remixing (original release only)
 Marion Schult – photography
 Cindy Palmano – photograph of Raven
 Stylorouge – sleeve design
 Alex Zander – crew
 Fil. E. – crew

Charts

References

External links 

 

1986 albums
Killing Joke albums
Albums produced by Chris Tsangarides
Albums produced by Chris Kimsey
Albums produced by Stewart Levine
E.G. Records albums
New wave albums by English artists